Mygdonia is a suburb and a former municipality in the Thessaloniki regional unit, Greece. Since the 2011 local government reform it is part of the municipality Oraiokastro, of which it is a municipal unit. Population 10,491 (2011). The municipal unit of Mygdonia includes three communities, Drymos (Δρυμός), Liti (Λητή) and Melissochori (Μελισσοχώρι). The seat of the municipality was in Liti. The municipal unit has an area of 98.506 km2.

According to archaeologists, the area has been inhabited since the Mesolithic era  (9000-7000 BC). The first inhabitants were Pelasgians, followed by Thracian tribes such as the Mygdones and the Edoni, until Alexander I of Macedon conquered and annexed the area.

Archaeological discoveries have been made in the area, near the Liti village and at the location Derveni. Discoveries include the ruins of the ancient city of Lete, ancient Macedonian tombs, tombstones, altars, statues, clay statuettes, coins, etc. Perhaps the most important discovery is the Derveni papyrus, an ancient Greek papyrus scroll, found in the city's necropolis in 1962 - a philosophical treatise on Orphic religion.

See also
Ancient Mygdonia

References

External links
Local news, cultural events, sports and educational activities can be found at http://www.mygdonia.gr,  an active local web site.

Populated places in Thessaloniki (regional unit)
Pelasgians
Mesolithic settlements

bg:Даутбал (дем)